The Riverside Discovery Center, formerly named the Riverside Park and Zoo, is a park and zoo complex along the North Platte River in Scottsbluff, Nebraska, United States.

Riverside Park is Scottsbluff's city park, and has the only zoo in western Nebraska. It includes three lakes with camping and recreation areas, and a riverside trail that runs along the banks of the North Platte River.  There are also over 30 garden spots.
December 16, 2017 two brother grizzly bears went on exhibit. In the spring of 2017 their mother was illegally killed in Wyoming.  State and Federal wildlife officials hoped the two orphaned cubs would survive in the wild without their mother.   After several months on their own in the wild, the two cubs became increasingly habituated to humans for food.  State and Federal wildlife officials were concerned about public safety and the well-being of the grizzly cubs.  When it was evident the cubs were not going to survive in the wild on their own, State and Federal wildlife officials made the decision to capture the two cubs and try to find them a home.  Riverside Discovery Center offered to assist in the rescue of the two cubs and to provide a new home for these two grizzly bear cubs.

Riverside Discovery Center was directly in the path of the August 21, 2017 total eclipse.

Animals
The Riverside Discovery Center has a collection of over 125 animals representing 50+ different species, in various exhibits.

North American Grasslands
Contains animals once common in the grasslands of North America:
 American bison (Bison bison)

Garden Walk
 Box turtle
 Greek tortoise
 African spurred tortoise
 Blue-and-yellow macaw

Slither Inn
mostly education animals behind the scenes

 Bearded dragon
 Boa constrictor
 Borneo python
 Grammostola pulchripes
 Mexican black kingsnake
 Uromastyx lizard
 Chinese water dragon

Raptor Row
Contains a collection of various raptors:
 Bald eagle (Haliaeetus leucocephalus)
 Turkey vulture (Cathartes aura)
 Swainson's hawk (Buteo swainsoni)
Red Tailed Hawk
Rough-legged Buzzard

Rainforest Discovery Center
An area dedicated to some of the smaller animals of the rainforest
 Waldrapp ibis (Geronticus eremita)
Mission golden-eyed tree frog
Squirrel Monkey
Emerald Tree Boa

Chimpanzee Building
Home of the areas chimpanzee and other unique creatures:
Chimpanzee
Ball python
Uromastyx
Leopard Gecko

Cat Complex
Home to various big cats:
Siberian tiger (Panthera tigris altaica)
Black leopard (Panthera pardus pardus)
Bobcat( Lynx rufus )

Primate Building
Contains a small collection of primates:
Colombian spider monkey
Chinchilla
Red ruffed lemur

Zebra Circle
 Zebra
 Swift Fox
Muntjac

Children's Zoo
Donkey (Equus asinus)
Pot-bellied pig
Highland Cattle
Wild Turkey (Meleagris gallopavo)

Pond
Trumpeter Swan

Miscellaneous exhibits
There are other animals that are not included in any of the aforementioned exhibits:
Bobcat
Raccoon
Grizzly Bear
Marbled Fox
Porcupine
Opossum

Incidents

On December 29, 1994, a leopard attacked a female zookeeper and bit her on the neck. The accident was featured on the television series Rescue 911 in 1995.

Conservation
The Riverside Discovery Center is actively involved in the Survival Species Program for various species of imperiled wildlife on display.

The zoo and park is located a half mile west of Nebraska Highway 71.

References

External links

Zoos in Nebraska
Tourist attractions in Scotts Bluff County, Nebraska
Buildings and structures in Scotts Bluff County, Nebraska
Museums in Scotts Bluff County, Nebraska
Natural history museums in Nebraska